Artem Yuryevich Lobuzov (Russian: Артём Юрьевич Лобузов, born 24 January 1991) is a Russian swimmer who competes in freestyle events. He represented the Russian Federation at the Olympic Games. Lobuzov's lifetime best in the 200 m freestyle is 1.46:96 in long course, and 1:42.44 in short course.

In March 2022, Lobuzov received a back-acting four year suspension from FINA lasting 25 August 2021 through 24 August 2025 due to an anti-doping rule violation. Three months later, his results in two relays from 2014 and 2016 were formally disqualified and all relay members, including those not disqualified, had their medals re-allocated to the former silver medal teams, the relay teams from the United States in both cases.

Swimming career

Lobuzov started swimming at the age of seven.  He was originally more interested in basketball, but all his friends were swimmers so he joined in.  He made his international debut at the 2010 European Short Course Championships in Eindhoven.

2011 FINA World Cup

At the short-course FINA World Cup in 2011 in Moscow, Lobuzov competed and set personal bests in two events. In the 100m Freestyle, he logged his a new personal best at 49.17 seconds. Although, he placed finished in ninth place, behind teammate Nikita Lobintsev who placed first, he beat Michael Phelps who finished in 11th.  Lobuzov stated he was satisfied at the result of beating Phelps.  In the 400m freestyle he also set a personal best, a time of  3:54:21.  He finished in 13th place, again behind Lobintsev.  The event was won by Paul Biedermann.

A day later, in the 200m Freestyle, Lobuzov reached the final, where he swam a time of 1:46:69 to finish in 6th place, with Biedermann winning again.

2012 Summer Olympics

At the 2012 Summer Olympics in London, Lobuzov competed in the 200 meters freestyle and the men's 4 × 200 m freestyle relay.

On 29 July 2012, Lobuzov raced in the 200 meters freestyle.  He swan in heat 6 against Brett Fraser (Cayman Island), Matthew Stanley (New Zealand), Thomas Fraser-Holmes (Australia), Sebastiaan Verschuren (Netherlands), Park Tae-Hwan (South Korea) and Yannick Agnel (France).  Lobuzov finished in 6th in the heat, in a time of 1:47.91. He was the fifteenth fastest swimmer in the heats, qualifying for the semifinal.  Lobuzov swam in the first semifinal.  He was last in his heat and 16th overall, with a time of 1:48.26, and therefore did not qualify for the final.

On 31 July 2012, Lobuzov swam in the men's 4 × 200 m freestyle relay for Russia, with Evgeny Lagunov, Mikhail Polishchuk and Alexander Sukhorukov. They swam a time of 7:11.86, Lobuzov's leg was 1:48.30.  They finished in fifth in the heat, and tenth overall, and therefore did not qualify for the final.

2013 World Championships 
At the 2013 World Championships, Lobuzov won his first international medal, winning silver as part of the Russian  freestyle team.

In 2017, he was awarded the title of Honoured Master of Sport in the Russian Federation.

Personal bests
Long Course:

Short Course:

References

External links
 
 
 

1991 births
Living people
Russian male swimmers
Olympic swimmers of Russia
Swimmers at the 2012 Summer Olympics
World Aquatics Championships medalists in swimming
Medalists at the FINA World Swimming Championships (25 m)
Universiade gold medalists for Russia
Universiade medalists in swimming
Medalists at the 2013 Summer Universiade